Dalling may refer to:

People
Bruce Dalling (1938–2008), South African yachtsman
Henry Bulwer, 1st Baron Dalling and Bulwer (1801–1872), British politician, diplomat and writer
Sir John Dalling, 1st Baronet (1731–1798), British soldier and colonial administrator
Dalling baronets, a title in the Baronetage of Great Britain

Places
Field Dalling, a village in Norfolk, England
Wood Dalling, a village in Norfolk, England
Dalling Monastery, a Buddhist monastery in Sikkim, India